Ecsenius lividanalis, known commonly as the blue-head combtooth-blenny in Indonesia and also known as the blue-headed combtooth blenny, is a species of combtooth blenny in the genus Ecsenius. It is found in coral reefs throughout the western Pacific ocean. It can reach a maximum length of 5 centimetres. Blennies in this species feed primarily off of plants, including benthic algae and weeds, and are commercial aquarium fish. There are two colour forms of this blenny, both of which have a black spot around the anus. One form has a blue head with a yellow body and iris while the other form is dark, occasionally all yellow, with a bluish-white iris, a yellow back and a yellow caudal fin.

References
 Chapman, W. M.  and L. P. Schultz  1952 (24 Apr.) Review of the fishes of the blennioid genus Ecsenius, with descriptions of five new species. Proceedings of the United States National Museum v. 102 (3310): 507–528.

lividanalis
Fish described in 1952